Eddie "Cleanhead" Vinson & Roomful of Blues is an album by saxophonist/vocalist Eddie "Cleanhead" Vinson and blues big band Roomful of Blues which was recorded and released by the Muse label in 1978.

Reception

The retrospective AllMusic review by Scott Yanow stated "If there were justice in the world, Eddie "Cleanhead" Vinson would have been able to tour with this type of group throughout much of his career. Roomful of Blues, a popular five-horn nonet, has rarely sounded more exciting than on this musical meeting with the legendary singer/altoist. Vinson himself is exuberant on some of the selections ... Whether one calls it blues, bebop, or early R&B, this accessible music is very enjoyable and deserves to be more widely heard".

Track listing
 "House of Joy" (Bernie Hanighen, Cootie Williams) – 3:18
 "He Was a Friend of Mine" (Hank Crawford) – 3:20
 "Movin' with Lester" (Lester Young) – 7:00
 "No Bones" (Al Copley, Ronnie Horvath) – 5:52
 "That's the Groovy Thing" (Earl Bostic) – 4:24
 "Past Sixty Blues" (Art Hillery) – 4:22
 "Street Lights" (Eddie Davis) – 6:27
 "Farmer's Daughter Blues" (Stan Seltzer) – 3:43

Personnel
Eddie "Cleanhead" Vinson – alto saxophone, vocals
Bob Enos – trumpet
Porky Cohen – trombone
Rich Lataille – alto saxophone
Greg Piccolo – tenor saxophone
Doug James – baritone saxophone
Ronnie Earl Horvath – guitar
Al Copley – piano
Jimmy Wimpfheimer – bass
John Rossi  – drums

References

Muse Records albums
Eddie Vinson albums
1982 albums
Albums produced by Bob Porter (record producer)